"Night Time Lover" is the second single by American singer La Toya Jackson, from her eponymous debut (1980). The track was produced and co-written by her brother, fellow American singer Michael Jackson, who provides co-lead vocals on the chorus. They originally wrote the song for Donna Summer under the title "Fire Is the Feeling".

Bobby DeBarge of American musical band Switch, La Toya's love interest at the time, wrote the 1980 song "You and I" in response. The song begins: "You know, I was listening to the radio the other day, and I heard the words that you said, that I'm your night time lover."

La Toya performed the song on the November 10, 1980 episode of the Dutch TV program TopPop and a month later on the December 13 episode of American Bandstand.

On the online music database AllMusic, editor Justin Kantor provides the following description to the song: "Another primer is 'Night Time Lover,' a softly seductive, simultaneously kinetic number produced by brother Michael."

Charts

References

1980 singles
La Toya Jackson songs
Michael Jackson songs
Song recordings produced by Michael Jackson
Songs written by Michael Jackson
1980 songs
Polydor Records singles